This article lists all English Poor Law Unions.

Note for table: 'PLU' stands for Poor Law Union and 'PLP' stands for Poor Law Parish.

Bedfordshire
Link to 1888 map showing Bedfordshire PLUs;
Link to 1909 map showing Bedfordshire PLUs;
Link to 1922 map showing Bedfordshire PLUs

Berkshire
Link to 1888 map showing Berkshire PLUs;
Link to 1909 map showing Berkshire PLUs;
Link to 1928 map showing Berkshire PLUs

Buckinghamshire

Link to 1888 map showing Buckinghamshire PLUs;
Link to 1909 map showing Buckinghamshire PLUs;
Link to 1928 map showing Buckinghamshire PLUs

Cambridgeshire and Isle of Ely
Link to 1888 map showing Cambridgeshire PLUs;
Link to 1909 map showing Cambridgeshire PLUs;
Link to 1930 map showing Cambridgeshire PLUs

Cheshire
Link to 1888 map showing Cheshire PLUs;
Link to 1908 map showing Cheshire PLUs;
Link to 1927 map showing Cheshire PLUs

Cornwall
Link to 1888 map showing Cornwall PLUs;
Link to 1909 map showing Cornwall PLUs;
Link to 1928 map showing Cornwall PLUs

Cumberland
Link to 1888 map showing Cumberland PLUs;
Link to 1909 map showing Cumberland PLUs;
Link to 1924 map showing Cumberland PLUs

Derbyshire
Link to 1888 map showing Derbyshire PLUs;
Link to 1908 map showing Derbyshire PLUs;
Link to 1922 map showing Derbyshire PLUs

Devon
Link to 1888 map showing Devon PLUs;
Link to 1909 map showing Devon - North PLUs;
Link to 1909 map showing Devon - South PLUs;
Link to 1928 map showing Devon - North PLUs;
Link to 1928 map showing Devon - South PLUs

Exeter had a workhouse union dating back to 1697, which was never converted into a poor law union under the 1834 Act.

Dorset

Link to 1888 map showing Dorset PLUs;
Link to 1909 map showing Dorset PLUs;
Link to 1930 map showing Dorset PLUs

County Durham
Link to 1888 map showing County Durham PLUs;
Link to 1909 map showing County Durham PLUs;
Link to 1930 map showing County Durham PLUs

Essex
Link to 1888 map showing Essex PLUs;
Link to 1909 map showing Essex PLUs;
Link to 1927 map showing Essex PLUs

Gloucestershire
Link to 1888 map showing Gloucestershire PLUs;
Link to 1909 map showing Gloucestershire PLUs;
Link to 1928 map showing Gloucestershire PLUs

Hampshire
Link to 1888 map showing Hampshire PLUs;
Link to 1907 map showing Hampshire PLUs;
Link to 1927 map showing Hampshire PLUs

Herefordshire
Link to 1888 map showing Herefordshire PLUs;
Link to 1909 map showing Herefordshire PLUs;
Link to 1924 map showing Herefordshire PLUs

Hertfordshire
Link to 1888 map showing Hertfordshire PLUs;
Link to 1908 map showing Hertfordshire PLUs;
Link to 1926 map showing Hertfordshire PLUs

Huntingdonshire
Link to 1888 map showing Huntingdonshire PLUs;
Link to 1909 map showing Huntingdonshire PLUs;
Link to 1924 map showing Huntingdonshire PLUs

Kent
Link to 1888 map showing Kent PLUs;
Link to 1913 map showing Kent PLUs;
Link to 1928 map showing Kent PLUs

Lancashire
Link to 1888 map showing Lancashire PLUs;
Link to 1914 map showing Lancashire PLUs;
Link to 1928 map showing Lancashire PLUs

Leicestershire
Link to 1888 map showing Leicestershire PLUs;
Link to 1909 map showing Leicestershire PLUs;
Link to 1923 map showing Leicestershire PLUs

Lincolnshire
Link to 1888 map showing Lincolnshire PLUs;
Link to 1910 map showing Lincolnshire PLUs;
Link to 1930 map showing Lincolnshire PLUs

London
Link to 1910 map showing London PLUs;
Link to 1928 map showing London PLUs

Middlesex

Link to 1888 map showing Middlesex PLUs; Link to 1909 map showing Middlesex PLUs; Link to 1921 map showing Middlesex PLUs

Norfolk
Link to 1888 map showing Norfolk PLUs;
Link to 1910 map showing Norfolk PLUs;
Link to 1929 map showing Norfolk PLUs

Northamptonshire and Soke of Peterborough
Link to 1888 map showing Northamptonshire PLUs;
Link to 1909 map showing Northamptonshire PLUs;
Link to 1929 map showing Northamptonshire PLUs

Northumberland
Link to 1888 map showing Northumberland PLUs;
Link to 1906 map showing Northumberland PLUs;
Link to 1930 map showing Northumberland PLUs

Nottinghamshire
Link to 1888 map showing Nottinghamshire PLUs;
Link to 1909 map showing Nottinghamshire PLUs;
Link to 1927 map showing Nottinghamshire PLUs

Oxfordshire
Link to 1888 map showing Oxfordshire PLUs;
Link to 1909 map showing Oxfordshire PLUs;
Link to 1928 map showing Oxfordshire PLUs

Rutland
Link to 1888 map showing Rutland PLUs;
Link to 1909 map showing Rutland PLUs;
Link to 1924 map showing Rutland PLUs

Shropshire
Link to 1888 map showing Shropshire PLUs;
Link to 1910 map showing Shropshire PLUs;
Link to 1928 map showing Shropshire PLUs

Somerset
Link to 1888 map showing Somerset PLUs;
Link to 1909 map showing Somerset PLUs;
Link to 1928 map showing Somerset PLUs

Staffordshire
Link to 1888 map showing Staffordshire PLUs;
Link to 1908 map showing Staffordshire PLUs;
Link to 1928 map showing Staffordshire PLUs

Suffolk
Link to 1888 map showing Suffolk PLUs;
Link to 1909 map showing Suffolk PLUs;
Link to 1924 map showing Suffolk PLUs

Surrey
Link to 1888 map showing Surrey PLUs;
Link to 1908 map showing Surrey PLUs;
Link to 1927 map showing Surrey PLUs

Sussex
Link to 1888 map showing Sussex PLUs;
Link to 1909 map showing Sussex PLUs;
Link to 1928 map showing Sussex PLUs

Warwickshire
Link to 1888 map showing Warwickshire PLUs;
Link to 1910 map showing Warwickshire PLUs;
Link to 1929 map showing Warwickshire PLUs

Westmorland
Link to 1888 map showing Westmorland PLUs;
Link to 1910 map showing Westmorland PLUs;
Link to 1923 map showing Westmorland PLUs

Wiltshire
Link to 1888 map showing Wiltshire PLUs;
Link to 1909 map showing Wiltshire PLUs;
Link to 1928 map showing Wiltshire PLUs

Worcestershire
Link to 1888 map showing Worcestershire PLUs;
Link to 1909 map showing Worcestershire PLUs;
Link to 1928 map showing Worcestershire PLUs

Yorkshire

East Riding of Yorkshire
Link to 1888 map showing East Riding of Yorkshire PLUs;
Link to 1910 map showing East Riding of Yorkshire PLUs;
Link to 1927 map showing East Riding of Yorkshire PLUs

North Riding of Yorkshire
Link to 1888 map showing North Riding of Yorkshire PLUs;
Link to 1910 map showing North Riding of Yorkshire PLUs;
Link to 1928 map showing North Riding of Yorkshire PLUs

West Riding of Yorkshire
Link to 1888 map showing West Riding of Yorkshire PLUs;
Link to 1927 map showing West Riding of Yorkshire - South PLUs;
Link to 1927 map showing West Riding of Yorkshire - North PLUs

References

 
Poor law unions